Robertus Anglicus or Robert the Englishman may refer to:
Robert of Chester, 12th-century Arabist
Robert of Retines, 12th-century Arabist and theologian
Robert (bishop of Olomouc), ruled 1201–40
Robert Kilwardby, archbishop of Canterburgy (1272–78)
Robertus Anglicus, 13th-century astronomer